The Exception is a 2016 romantic war film directed by David Leveaux (in his directorial debut) and written by Simon Burke, based on Alan Judd's 2003 novel The Kaiser's Last Kiss. The film stars Jai Courtney, Lily James, Janet McTeer, and Christopher Plummer. The plot is a fictionalized account of the life of exiled Kaiser Wilhelm II (Plummer). When a Wehrmacht officer (Courtney) is ordered to determine whether or not a British spy has infiltrated the Kaiser's residence with a view to assassinating the deposed monarch, he falls in love with one of the Kaiser's maids (James) during his investigation. The film is set in Occupied Netherlands during World War II.

In 2014, Egoli Tossell Film announced that development on a film adaptation of Judd's novel had begun. Principal photography in Belgium lasted six weeks in 2015. The film held its world premiere at the 2016 Toronto International Film Festival in the Special Presentations section. The film received a limited release and video-on-demand release on 2 June 2017 through A24 and DirecTV Cinema in the United States. The film was released on 2 October 2017 in the United Kingdom through Signature Entertainment.

Plot
During World War II, Wehrmacht Captain Stefan Brandt is assigned to take command of the personal bodyguard of deposed German Emperor Wilhelm II at his estate of Huis Doorn, near Utrecht, Netherlands. The Nazi authorities are concerned that an Allied spy may be planning to assassinate the former Kaiser. While Wilhelm is an elderly man with no power, the SS are aware that he still has great symbolic importance to the German people.

Despite the Kaiser's adjutant, Colonel Sigurd von Ilsemann, giving Brandt strict orders not to interfere with the female servants, Brandt is quickly drawn into a lustful act but this soon develops into a passionate affair with Mieke de Jong (one of the maids) who reciprocates his advances, she reveals to Brandt that she is Jewish and after a pause, he replies, "I'm not," telling her not to share her secret with anyone else, the clear implication is that he is infatuated with her and she him.

Gestapo Inspector Dietrich informs Brandt that the British Secret Service has an agent with a radio hidden somewhere in a nearby village and orders Brandt to identify the second agent known to be inside the ex-Kaiser's household.

Prior to a visit from SS Commander Heinrich Himmler, Brandt notices a smell of gun oil from Mieke's room. He follows Mieke when she visits the village pastor andwatching outside a windowhears her tell the pastor that she is prepared to assassinate Himmler as revenge for the SS having murdered her father and husband. The pastor responds that assassinating Himmler is not their mission.

The SS pinpoints the pastor’s radio transmissions. They arrest and savagely torture him, demanding the name of the other spy. Shortly afterward, Wilhelm's ambitious wife Hermine, jealous of Wilhelm's fondness for Mieke, tells him of Brandt and Mieke's affair. She expects her husband to dismiss Mieke and have Brandt court-martialed, but the ex-Kaiser angrily responds that even though he no longer rules Germany, he will rule his own house. In private, he reveals to the lovers that he fathered illegitimate children before and after marrying his first wife, Empress Augusta Victoria. Saying he will not be a hypocrite, the Kaiser orders the lovers to go about their duties, but to be more discreet.

During a planned house search before Himmler's arrival, Brandt himself searches Mieke's room to protect her cover. Brandt learns as Himmler is arriving that the tortured pastor will soon reveal Mieke's identity and he urges her to flee. She refuses, insisting that she has a mission.

Himmler extends to Wilhelm an invitation from Adolf Hitler to return to his former throne in Berlin. He then meets with Brandt and Dietrich, informing them that the invitation is a bluff, intended to draw out and execute anti-Nazi monarchists in the German resistance. Hermine is overjoyed at the thought of finally becoming Empress of Germany once again but Wilhelm, troubled by Himmler's boasts about the euthanasia of disabled children, remains unsureeven when Colonel von Ilsemann speaks to him of how Wilhelm can become "a restraining influence."

When Brandt asks von Ilsemann whether an officer can serve something other than his country, the Colonel replies, "First you must decide what is your country and if it even still exists." Brandt pauses, then tells von Ilsemann of Himmler's plans for the Kaiser's supporters.

Mieke completes her mission by delivering to Wilhelm a message from Winston Churchill, offering the Kaiser political asylum in the United Kingdom and the throne of a defeated Germany after the war. Wilhelm refuses, having decided that he is finally at peace with the loss of his throne.

As the Gestapo closes in on Mieke, Brandt devises an escape plan. Wilhelm, Mieke, and Brandt escape in a van as the Kaiser pretends to have a heart attack. In the process, Mieke almost takes a suicide pill, Brandt saves her life and capture by killing Dietrich and another SS officer. Mieke asks Brandt to flee with her, fearing he will be executed for the murders. Brandt insists that he has a duty to Germany and has a good alibi. As Mieke departs, Brandt asks Mieke to marry him. She tells Brandt yes and to find her after the war, then she flees into the woods.

Some time later, Brandt is working at a desk in Berlin. He is delivered a package, which contains a book of Friedrich Nietzsche's writings that Mieke had once shown him. Inside is written a London address. In London, Mieke is seated on a park bench when she is informed that Churchill is ready to see her. Rising, Mieke puts her hand on her belly, revealing that she is pregnant. In Doorn, Colonel von Ilsemann informs Wilhelm that Brandt has called from Berlin with wonderful news. Realising this means Mieke has successfully escaped to Britain, Wilhelm is overjoyed.

Cast
 Lily James as Mieke de Jong
 Jai Courtney as Captain Stefan Brandt
 Janet McTeer as Princess Hermine Reuss of Greiz
 Christopher Plummer as Kaiser Wilhelm II
 Eddie Marsan as Heinrich Himmler
 Ben Daniels as Colonel Sigurd von Ilsemann
 Mark Dexter as Dietrich
 Kris Cuppens as Pastor Hendriks
 Anton Lesser as General Falkenberg
 Lucas Tavernier as SS-Colonel Meyer

Production

Pre-production
Christopher Plummer's longtime manager and one of the film's lead producers, Lou Pitt, was recommended Alan Judd's novel The Kaiser's Last Kiss. Pitt said, "The first time I heard about the novel was from Chris who liked the character and setting quite a lot as did I after reading it ... this would have been around 2005 or 2006. At the time, the book was under option, but for good reason, we kept an eye on it.”

On 21 May 2014, Egoli Tossell Film and its parent company Film House Germany revealed that a film adaptation of Judd's novel was in development. At the 2015 Cannes Film Festival, Lotus Entertainment handled international sales for the film, previously titled The Kaiser's Last Kiss.

Casting
On 12 May 2015, it was announced that Lily James would play the character Mieke de Jong. On 7 July 2015, Jai Courtney was cast in the leading role as Captain Stefan Brandt. On 11 September 2015, Janet McTeer and Eddie Marsan joined the cast of The Kaiser's Last Kiss as Princess Hermine Reuss of Greiz and Heinrich Himmler, respectively.

Filming
On 11 September 2015, it was confirmed that principal photography was underway in Belgium, The film was shot in 33 days over six weeks mainly in the Leeuwergem Castle and in various locations in Belgium in 2015.

Release
In October 2016, A24 and DirecTV Cinema acquired U.S distribution rights to the film. The film was released on 2 June 2017. The film was the closing-night selection of the 2017 Newport Beach Film Festival, where Lily James' performance was referred to as "a true breakout" by Festival co-founder and chief executive officer Gregg Schwenk. It was released on DVD and Blu-ray in the U.S. by Lionsgate on 8 August 2017.

Critical response

Review aggregation website Rotten Tomatoes reports an approval rating of 73% based on 60 reviews, with an average rating of 6.2/10. The site's critical consensus reads, "The Exception (The Kaiser's Last Kiss) elegantly blends well-dressed period romance and war drama into a solidly crafted story further elevated by Christopher Plummer's excellent work and the efforts of a talented supporting cast." Metacritic gives the film a score of 60 out of 100, based on reviews from 15 critics, indicating "mixed or average reviews".

References

External links
 
  
 

2016 films
2016 romantic drama films
2010s spy films
2016 directorial debut films
American romantic drama films
American spy films
British romantic drama films
British spy films
World War II spy films
Films scored by Ilan Eshkeri
Films set in the Netherlands
A24 (company) films
Cultural depictions of Heinrich Himmler
Cultural depictions of Wilhelm II
2010s English-language films
2010s American films
2010s British films